State Route 12 or Scenic Byway 12 (SR-12), also known as "Highway 12 — A Journey Through Time Scenic Byway", is a  state highway designated an All-American Road located in Garfield County and Wayne County, Utah, United States.

Route description

Proceeding west to east for 122 miles (nearly 200 km), the highway starts south of Panguitch at an intersection with US-89, crosses part of Dixie National Forest and Bryce Canyon National Park, continues through the small towns of Tropic, Cannonville, and Henrieville. It crosses various parts of Grand Staircase–Escalante National Monument (GS-ENM), continues northeast through Escalante and over the Escalante River, then over the Hogback, a narrow ridge with no guardrails or shoulders and steep drop-offs on each side. It then proceeds north through more of GS-ENM, Boulder, the Aquarius Plateau, Grover, ending in Torrey at an intersection with SR-24, five miles (8 km) west of Capitol Reef National Park.

The segment of SR-12 between the US-89 and SR-63 junctions is part of the National Highway System.

Traffic volume
The Average Daily Traffic (AADT) on SR-12 is at its greatest at its western junction with US-89, where the count for 2005 was 2,430. At its other end, at the junction with SR-24, the traffic bottoms out at 435.

History

The road from Bryce Canyon Junction to Tropic was added to the state highway system in 1914, and in 1923 a branch from Tropic Junction to Bryce Canyon was built as a forest road. The State Road Commission numbered the route to Bryce Canyon SR-12 in the 1920s, and in 1927 the state legislature assigned it to both branches, to Bryce Canyon and Tropic, but split off the branch to Tropic as State Route 54 in 1931. That same year, a new State Route 120 was created, continuing the road from Tropic to Henrieville, and in 1935 it became part of SR-54. Another road was also added to the state highway system in 1914, connecting SR-22 at Widtsoe with Escalante, and it was numbered State Route 23 in 1927. An extension took SR-23 northeast to Boulder in 1941, and in 1947 SR-54 absorbed SR-23, with the Widtsoe-Escalante road dropped in favor of Henrieville-Escalante. State Route 117, running southeast from SR-24 near Teasdale to Grover, became a state highway in 1931, and was extended south to Boulder in 1957, becoming part of SR-54 in 1966. In 1969, SR-54 became part of SR-12, but most of former SR-117 was dropped, leaving SR-12 to stretch from Bryce Canyon Junction to the north limit of Boulder (at the Dixie National Forest boundary), with a short spur to Bryce Canyon. This spur became a new SR-63 in 1975, and in 1985 the route was extended back north from Boulder to SR-24, using a different route than the old SR-117 north of Grover.

Major intersections

See also
Paunsaugunt Plateau

Gallery

References

External links

 Map and more from the DOT's American Byways website
State of Utah's website for the highway
 
 

Utah State Route 012
Bryce Canyon National Park
Utah State Route 012
Grand Staircase–Escalante National Monument
Historic American Engineering Record in Utah
Landmarks in Utah
National Forest Scenic Byways
Utah State Route 012
012
 012
012
 012
Tourist attractions in Garfield County, Utah
Tourist attractions in Wayne County, Utah